Kolmanskop (Afrikaans for “Coleman's head”) is a ghost town in the Namib in southern Namibia, ten kilometres inland from the port town of Lüderitz. It was named after a transport driver named Johnny Coleman who, during a sand storm, abandoned his ox wagon on a small incline opposite the settlement. Once a small but very rich mining village, it is now a tourist destination run by the joint firm Namibia-De Beers.

History

Foundation and peak
In 1908, in what was then German South-West Africa, the worker Zacharias Lewala found a diamond while working in this area and showed it to his supervisor, the German railway inspector August Stauch. Realizing the area was rich in diamonds, German miners began settlement, and soon after the German Empire declared a large area as a "Sperrgebiet", starting to exploit the diamond field.

Driven by the enormous wealth of the first diamond miners, the residents built the village in the architectural style of a German town, with amenities and institutions including a hospital, ballroom, power station, school, skittle-alley, theatre and sport-hall, casino, ice factory and the first x-ray-station in the southern hemisphere, as well as the first tram in Africa. It had a railway link to Lüderitz.

Decline
The town started to decline during World War I when the diamond-field slowly started to deplete. By the early 1920s, the area was in a severe decline. Hastening the town’s demise was the discovery in 1928 of the richest diamond-bearing deposits ever known, on the beach terraces 270 km south of Kolmanskop, near the Orange River. Many of the town’s inhabitants joined the rush to the south, leaving their homes and possessions behind. The new diamond find merely required scouting the beaches as opposed to more difficult mining. The town was ultimately abandoned in 1956. The geological forces of the desert mean that tourists now walk through houses knee-deep in sand. Kolmanskop is popular with photographers for its settings of the desert sands' reclaiming this once-thriving town, and the arid climate preserving the traditional Edwardian architecture in the area. Due to its location within the restricted area (Sperrgebiet) of the Namib desert, tourists need a permit to enter the town.

In popular culture
Kolmanskop was featured on the series Mysteries of the Abandoned episode entitled "Animal Uprising", that first aired October 18, 2020 on the Animal Planet Channel. 
Kolmanskop was used as the location for the South African TV movie The Mantis Project (1987). Directed by Manie van Rensburg, produced by Paul Kemp, written by John Cundill, and starred Marius Weyers and Sandra Prinsloo.
The town was used as one of the locations in the 1993 film Dust Devil.
The 2000 film The King Is Alive was filmed in Kolmanskop, with the town used as the film's main setting.
The town was featured in a 2010 episode of Life After People. The episode focused on the effects of wind and sand upon the various run-down buildings and displayed rooms that were filled with sand.
The town was used as one of the locations in the 1994 film Lunarcop.
The town was used in the first episode of the BBC series Wonders of the Universe to help explain entropy and its effect on time.
The television series Destination Truth in one of its episodes investigated Kolmanskop, rumored to be haunted.
Tim Walker photographed Agyness Deyn in Kolmanskop, Namibia for Vogue UK in May 2011.
The 2011 non-narrative film Samsara features shots filmed in Kolmanskop.
Featured in 2011 on Season 1, Episode 2 Namibia/Bodie of the television show Forgotten Planet.
The cover of Tame Impala's fourth album, The Slow Rush and its singles were photographed at Kolmanskop by Neil Krug.
The music video for George Watsky's Undermine from the Placement album was filmed in Kolmanskop.

Literature 
 Noli, Gino: Desert Diamonds. Gino Noli, Plettenberg Bay 2010, .

Gallery

See also

Elizabeth Bay

References

External links
  
 
 

Former populated places in Namibia
Ghost towns in Africa
History of Namibia
Lüderitz
Diamond industry